The Tango Singer is a novel by Tomás Eloy Martínez, which was translated to English by Anne McLean. The plot about a New York student that travels to Buenos Aires in 2001, amid the riots of the time, and searches for a tango singer.

References 

Novels by Tomás Eloy Martínez
2004 novels
Books about tango
Novels set in Buenos Aires